Philippe Baradel (6 January 1938 – 31 March 2009) was a French cross-country skier. He competed in the men's 30 kilometre event at the 1968 Winter Olympics.

References

1938 births
2009 deaths
French male cross-country skiers
Olympic cross-country skiers of France
Cross-country skiers at the 1968 Winter Olympics
Sportspeople from Vosges (department)
20th-century French people